Daqingshan County is a county in Heilongjiang Province, China. It is under the administration of the prefecture-level city of Yichun. The county was established by merging the former Dailing District and Langxiang Town of Tieli City approved by Chinese State Council in 2019. The county seat is Dailing Subdistrict.

Administrative divisions
Dajingshan is divided into five subdistricts: * Tuanjie Shequ, Yuxi Shequ, Yongsheng Shequ, Tienan Shequ, Binbei Shequ
and the only one town: Langxiang .

Notes and references 

Dailing